Paranacoleia is a genus of moths of the family Crambidae.

Species
Paranacoleia cuspidata Du & Li, 2008
Paranacoleia elegantula Du & Li, 2008
Paranacoleia lophophoralis (Hampson, 1912)
Paranacoleia lubrica Du & Li, 2008

References

Spilomelinae
Crambidae genera